Chamaesphecia leucopsiformis is a moth of the family Sesiidae. It is found in most of  Europe (except Ireland, Great Britain, the Benelux, Portugal, Denmark, Fennoscandia, the Baltic region and Greece) and Turkey.

The wingspan is 18–21 mm. Adults are in wing from August to September.

The larvae feed on Euphorbia cyparissias, Euphorbia esula and Euphorbia seguieriana.

References

Moths described in 1800
Sesiidae
Moths of Europe
Moths of Asia